Dairy Art Centre was an art gallery in the premises of a former dairy in London founded in 2013 by Frank Cohen and Nicolai Frahm which exhibited work from their personal collections, as well as from other institutions. It was also used a venue to hire for events 

Dairy Art Centre's inaugural exhibition in early 2013 was called Quicksand by John Armleder.

In 2014, Julian Schnabel presented Every Angel has a Dark Side, his first solo exhibition in a public art space in the UK for nearly 15 years. The exhibition was universally panned by local art critics, with the Guardian calling it "colossally bad" and the Telegraph labelling it as "irrefutably awful"

The gallery ceased its activities later that year on 7 December 2014

References 

Contemporary art galleries in London
Private collections in the United Kingdom